Clitoromegaly (or macroclitoris) is an abnormal enlargement of the clitoris that is mostly congenital or acquired, though deliberately induced clitoris enlargement as a form of genital body modification is achieved through various uses of anabolic steroids, including testosterone. Clitoromegaly is not the same as normal enlargement of the clitoris seen during sexual arousal.

Presentation
The different grade of genital ambiguity is commonly measured by the Prader classification, which ranges, in ascending order of masculinisation, from 1: female external genitalia with clitoromegaly through 5: pseudo-phallus looking like normal male external genitalia.

Causes
Clitoromegaly is a rare condition and can be either present by birth or acquired later in life.
If present at birth, congenital adrenal hyperplasia can be one of the causes, since in this condition the adrenal gland of the female fetus produces additional androgens and the newborn baby has ambiguous genitalia which are not clearly male or female. In pregnant women who received norethisterone during pregnancy, masculinization of the fetus occurs, resulting in hypertrophy of the clitoris; however, this is rarely seen nowadays due to use of safer progestogens. It can also be caused by the autosomal recessive congenital disorder known as Fraser syndrome.

In acquired clitoromegaly, the main cause is endocrine hormonal imbalance affecting the adult person, including polycystic ovarian syndrome (PCOS) and hyperthecosis. Acquired clitoromegaly may also be caused by pathologies affecting the ovaries and other endocrine glands. These pathologies may include virulent (such as arrhenoblastoma) and neurofibromatosic tumors. Another cause is clitoral cysts. Sometimes there may be no obvious clinical or hormonal reason.

Female bodybuilders and athletes who use androgens, primarily to enhance muscular growth, strength and appearance , may also experience clearly evident enlargement of the clitoris and increases in libido. For transgender men taking testosterone as part of transgender hormone therapy (female-to-male) masculinization of the clitoris may be a desired effect. Women who use testosterone for therapeutic reasons (treating low libido, averting osteoporosis, as part of an anti-depressant regimen, etc.) may experience some enlargement of the clitoris, although the dosages warranted for these conditions are much lower. Pseudoclitoromegaly or pseudohypertrophy of the clitoris "has been reported in small girls due to masturbation: manipulations of the skin of prepuce leads to repeated mechanical trauma, which expands the prepuce and labia minora, thus imitating true clitoral enlargement".

Anatomy
In Atlas of Human Sex Anatomy (1949) by Robert Latou Dickinson, the typical clitoris is defined as having a crosswise width of 3 to 4 mm (0.12 - 0.16 inches) and a lengthwise width of 4 to 5 mm (0.16 - 0.20 inches). On the other hand, in obstetrics and gynecology medical literature, a frequent definition of clitoromegaly is when there is a clitoral index (product of lengthwise and crosswise widths) of greater than 35 mm2 (0.05 inches2), which is almost twice the size given above for an average sized clitoris.

Human rights concerns
Early surgical reduction of clitoromegaly via full or partial clitoridectomy is controversial, and intersex people exposed to such treatment have spoken of their loss of physical sensation, and loss of autonomy. In recent years, human rights institutions have criticized early surgical management of such characteristics.

In 2013, it was disclosed in a medical journal that four unnamed elite female athletes from developing countries were subjected to gonadectomies and partial clitoridectomies after testosterone testing revealed that they had an intersex condition. In April 2016, the United Nations Special Rapporteur on health, Dainius Pūras, condemned this treatment as a form of female genital mutilation "in the absence of symptoms or health issues warranting those procedures."

See also
 Pseudo-penis, an enlarged clitoris or other penis-like structure that is normally present in some mammal, bird, and insect species

References

External links 

Congenital disorders of female genital organs
Megaly
Intersex variations